Grand Island is a city in and the county seat of Hall County, Nebraska, United States. The population was 53,131 at the 2020 census.

Grand Island is the principal city of the Grand Island metropolitan area, which consists of Hall, Merrick, Howard and Hamilton counties. The Grand Island metropolitan area has an official population of 83,472 residents.

Grand Island has been given the All-America City Award four times (1955, 1967, 1981, and 1982) by the National Civic League.

Grand Island is home to the Nebraska Law Enforcement Training Center, which is the sole agency responsible for training law enforcement officers throughout the state, as well as the home of the Southern Power District serving southern Nebraska.

History
In 1857, 35 German settlers left Davenport, Iowa, and headed west to Nebraska to start a new settlement on an island known by French traders as La Grande Isle, which was formed by the Wood River and the Platte River. The settlers reached their destination on July 4, 1857, and by September had built housing using local timber. They set up farms but initially had no market to sell their goods until a market opened at Fort Kearny. When the Pike's Peak Gold Rush began, Grand Island was the last place travelers could obtain supplies before they crossed the plains.

Surveyors from the Union Pacific Railroad (UP) laid out a town called Grand Island Station and many settlers living on Grand Island moved to the new town, located slightly inland from the island. In 1868 the railroad reached the area, bringing increased trade and business. Grand Island became the end of the east division of the railroad and UP built service facilities for their locomotives in the town as well as an elegant hotel for passengers providing a boost for the local economy. The cost of the railroad coming into town was the denudement of most of the hardwood trees on the island for use as ties for the railroad. By 1870, 1,057 people lived in the town and in 1872 the town was incorporated as Grand Island.

In about 1890, sugar beets were introduced as a crop in Nebraska. The first sugar beet processing factory in the United States was built in the southwest part of Grand Island.

1980 tornadoes

On June 3, 1980, Grand Island was hit by a massive supercell storm. Through the course of the evening, the city was ravaged by seven tornadoes, the worst of which was rated F4 on the Fujita Scale. The hardest hit area of town was the South Locust business district. There were five deaths as a result of the tornadoes.

Tornado Hill is a local landmark created as a direct result of the tornadoes. Debris that could not be recycled was burned near Fonner Park and what remained was buried within Ryder Park, on the west end of town. The base of the hill was a hole 6–8 feet deep and nearly 200 feet across, and the hill is 40 feet high. It is used for sledding in this otherwise flat area.

A book, Night of the Twisters, by Ivy Ruckman, and movie were based on this event.

Geography and climate

Demographics

2010 census
As of the census of 2010, there were 48,520 people, 18,326 households, and 11,846 families living in the city. The racial makeup of the city was 80.0% White, 2.1% African American, 1.0% Native American, 1.2% Asian, 0.2% Pacific Islander, 13.1% from other races, and 2.4% from two or more races. Hispanic or Latino people of any race were 26.7% of the population.

There were 18,326 households, of which 35.4% had children under the age of 18 living with them, 47.5% were married couples living together, 12.0% had a female householder with no husband present, 5.2% had a male householder with no wife present, and 35.4% were non-families. 29.1% of all households were made up of individuals, and 11.2% had someone living alone who was 65 years of age or older. The average household size was 2.59 and the average family size was 3.20.

The median age in the city was 34.7 years. 27.6% of residents were under the age of 18; 8.7% were between the ages of 18 and 24; 26.7% were from 25 to 44; 23.9% were from 45 to 64; and 13% were 65 years of age or older. The gender makeup of the city was 49.8% male and 50.2% female.

2000 census
As of the census of 2000, there were 42,940 people, 16,426 households, and 11,038 families living in the city. The population density was 2,000.2 people per square mile (772.2/km2). There were 17,421 housing units at an average density of 811.5 per square mile (313.3/km2). The racial makeup of the city was 86.72% White, 0.42% African American, 0.33% Native American, 1.31% Asian, 0.17% Pacific Islander, 9.64% from other races, and 1.42% from two or more races. Hispanic or Latino people of any race were 15.94% of the population.

There were 16,426 households, out of which 34.3% had children under the age of 18 living with them, 53.0% were married couples living together, 10.4% had a female householder with no husband present, and 32.8% were non-families. 27.1% of all households were made up of individuals, and 11.1% had someone living alone who was 65 years of age or older. The average household size was 2.55 and the average family size was 3.09.

In the city, the population was spread out, with 27.0% under the age of 18, 9.5% from 18 to 24, 28.6% from 25 to 44, 20.8% from 45 to 64, and 14.1% who were 65 years of age or older. The median age was 35 years. For every 100 females, there were 98.1 males. For every 100 females aged 18 and over, there were 96.0 males.

The median income for a household in the city was $36,044, and the median income for a family was $43,197. Males had a median income of $28,925 versus $20,521 for females. The per capita income for the city was $17,071. About 9.9% of families and 12.8% of the population were below the poverty line, including 16.7% of those under age 18 and 8.1% of those aged 65 or over.

Environmental issues

Construction of a primary water detention cell for flood control by the Central Platte River Natural Resources District, the city of Grand Island, Hall County, and Merrick County has been delayed by the slow cleanup of burning grounds with buried and unexploded gravel mines on the grounds of the former Cornhusker Army Ammunition Plant.

In 1981, a plume of contaminated groundwater was discovered beneath the plant area, which occupies 20 square miles west of Grand Island. The plume extended northeast of the plant for about five miles and migrated towards Grand Island. RDX was discovered at 371 parts per billion (ppb) and TNT at 445 ppb on the plant site and just over 100 ppb off-site. The safe drinking water standard for RDX and TNT is only 2 ppb.

Cornhusker had produced bombs and explosives during World War II, the Korean War, and Vietnam War, and had been put on standby status in October 1973. During munitions production, wastewater contaminated with explosives, and explosives-contaminated mops, buckets, and other equipment were buried in 56 earthen surface impoundments. Dried solids were periodically scraped from the impoundments and taken to the burning grounds for incineration and burial. After the discovery of contaminated groundwater in 1981, the Army extended Grand Island city water lines to rural subdivisions (that as of 2014 are part of the Capital Heights and Le Heights areas) in 1985 because wells may have exposed residents to the contaminated water. In 1987, the Army burned about 40,000 tons of explosives-contaminated soil. In 1993, city water lines in the northwest and north-central Grand Island were extended. In 1998, a pump-and-treat facility that continues to operate was built to cycle contaminated water through an explosives residue-removal system and discharge it as clean water into Silver Creek. The Army injected "hot spots" of contamination with a molasses-based substance containing bacteria present under the T&E Cattle Company feedlot to more quickly degrade RDX and TNT, which was intended to lower contamination levels.

In the late 1990s and early 2000s, the sites of bomb production lines (the so-called load line structures), were cleared and burned. , TNT is still present at 30 ppb, and 7 ppb for RDX in the hot spot under load line 1.

, the most heavily contaminated areas at Cornhusker are the burning grounds with buried and unexploded gravel mines. Their excavation proceeds very slowly, sifting one cubic yard at a time, because of the explosives' shock sensitivity. Excavation is expected to finish by January 2015, followed by environmental testing, estimated to take 24 to 36 months.

State Fair
In 2010 Grand Island became the home of the Nebraska State Fair.

Transportation
Interstate 80 is located four miles south of the city. U.S. Route 281 is the main north-south route in the city, running through the city's west edge south to Hastings, and north to O'Neill. U.S. Route 30 runs east-west through the center of Grand Island.

Central Nebraska Regional Airport is located in Grand Island. On September 4, 2008, Allegiant Air began nonstop service from Grand Island to Las Vegas, Nevada. In June 2011, American Eagle Airlines began providing service to Dallas/Fort Worth, Texas, twice daily.

The city's transit system is entirely demand-responsive, with rides requiring reservation 24 hours in advance. Grand Island also sports a total of fifteen traffic circles, many of which are within close proximity to each other. This system allows for particularly efficient through-traffic while sacrificing speed and barring transportation to some locations by certain, longer vehicles. Of these fifteen recorded roundabouts, fourteen are designated "official," while one is reportedly an "unofficial" insertion into the Grand Island's public transportation network.

Radio stations

KRGI (AM) 1430
LA GRAN D 93.3
KRGI-FM 96.5
KRGY FM 97.3
KKJK FM 103.1
KSYZ-FM 107.7

Hospitals
As of 2017, Grand Island was served by CHI Health St. Francis hospital, with 159 beds.
The city is also served by Grand Island Regional Medical Center, which opened in 2021.

Education

School districts
 Grand Island Public Schools
 Grand Island Northwest Public Schools

High schools
 Central Catholic High School
 Grand Island Senior High School
 Heartland Lutheran High School
 Northwest High School

Colleges
Central Community College
University of Nebraska at Kearney

Notable people
 Edith Abbott, social worker
 Grace Abbott, helped draft the Social Security Act
 Rick Allen, NASCAR commentator for NBC Sports
 Parnelia Augustine, painter
 Bil Baird, puppeteer
 Bo Evans, computer pioneer
 Joe Feeney, tenor on The Lawrence Welk Show
 Henry Fonda, Academy Award-winning film actor
 Dick Cavett 
 Channing Hill, jockey
 George J. Marrett, test pilot and author
G. P. Mix, two-time lieutenant governor of Idaho
 John Parrella, former NFL player
 John Pedersen, arms designer
 Tom Rathman, former NFL player
 Rebecca Richards-Kortum, bioengineering professor and MacArthur Fellow
 Jeff Richardson, baseball player
 Eve Ryder, artist
 William Henry Thompson, former U.S. Senator from Nebraska
 Edgar A. Wedgwood, sheriff of Hall County, Nebraska and adjutant general of the Utah National Guard
 Simeon Burt Wolbach, pathologist

See also 
Impact of the 2019–20 coronavirus pandemic on the meat industry in the United States

References

External links

 City of Grand Island
 The Grand Island Independent Newspaper
 Grand Island Public Library
 Masonic Temple Building

 
1872 establishments in Nebraska
Cities in Nebraska
County seats in Nebraska
Post at Grand Island
Grand Island micropolitan area
Cities in Hall County, Nebraska
Populated places established in 1872
Pre-statehood history of Nebraska
French-American history of Nebraska